Muhammad Amjad Saqib, (Punjabi, ; 1 February 1957) is a Pakistani social entrepreneur, development practitioner, former civil servant and author. He is the founder and executive director of Akhuwat Foundation, which is the world's largest Islamic microfinance organization that provides interest-free loans to the most deserving segments of society. He has been nominated for 2022 Nobel Peace Prize for his work for poverty alleviation.

Since its inception in 2001, the organization has now successfully disbursed over PKR 157 billion (US$884 million) in interest-free loans, helping over 5.5 million families across Pakistan. Adopting a multidimensional approach to poverty alleviation, Akhuwat has launched several other projects including Pakistan's first fee-free university - Akhuwat College University - which is open to talented students from across Pakistan, who would otherwise not be able to afford higher education. Akhuwat operates several other projects under its umbrella some of which include enhancing financial inclusion, access to education and healthcare, support of the transgender community as well as the provision of food and clothes.

Amjad Saqib is known for his work for social mobilization, poverty alleviation, microfinance, and education management. He has authored nine books which include Akhuwat ka Safar and Molu Musali, which describe his journey in forming Akhuwat and he regularly writes columns in several Pakistani newspapers. He is the recipient of several national and international honors including Sitara-e-Imtiaz, a coveted civil award of  Pakistan. He also received "Asia's Nobel Prize" Ramon Magsaysay Award in 2021 for his organisation's interest-free loan programme.

Life and career
Amjad Saqib was born in 1957 in Kamalia, a small city in Punjab. After completing his early education, he joined Government College, Lahore, and went on to complete his bachelor's degree in medicine (M.B.B.S) from King Edward Medical College in 1982. He was awarded the Hubert H. Humphrey Fellowship in 1995 and pursued his master's degree in Public Administration from American University, Washington D.C.

Muhammad Amjad Saqib also enrolled in a year-long program at  LUMS, which was in collaboration with McGill University related to Social Enterprise & Management. Additionally, he has completed several professional development courses on leadership from Harvard University.

In 2003, he decided to devote all his efforts towards working for public welfare and social development through the establishment of Akhuwat and decided to resign from the Pakistani Civil Service.

He provides consultancy services to different organizations including International Labour Organization, Asian Development Bank, UNICEF, World Bank, and Canadian International Development Agency. He has been invited to speak on the issues of poverty alleviation and social entrepreneurship at different institutions such as Harvard University, University of Oxford, and University of Cambridge. He was invited to speak at the United Nations Economic and Social Council on ‘Taking Action to Improve Lives’ conference, where he spoke about the need of adopting an integrated and holistic approach towards poverty reduction.

He is married to Farrukh Amjad; they have two children, Junaid Farid and Farazeen Amjad Shahid.

Akhuwat
Established in 2001, Akhuwat was the first organization in Pakistan to tackle the issue of poverty through the disbursement of interest-free loans also known as Qarz-e-Hasan. In 2021, Akhuwat's Islamic Microfinance program has disbursed PKR 157 Billion ($884 million) in interest-free loans with a repayment rate of 99.7% to 5.5 million families across Pakistan. The organization has a network of more than 8000 employees in over 853 branches across 400 cities in Pakistan.

Akhuwat is founded in accordance with the Islamic principle of MawaKhat or brotherhood. The earliest example of Mawakhat is seen in the solidarity formed by the citizens of Medina and the Muhajireen (or Meccans) who had migrated to Medina to escape persecution. The people of Medina shared half of their wealth and resources with the migrants. Inspired by this spirit, Akhuwat seeks to invoke this concept of brotherhood through its work. Keeping this in mind, Akhuwat believes in a poverty-free society that is based on the principles of compassion and equity.

Other than providing interest-free loans, Akhuwat has expanded its work into the field of education, health, and supporting the most marginalized segments of society. Akhuwat's programs include Akhuwat Education Services, Akhuwat Clothes Bank, Akhuwat Transgender Support Program, and Akhuwat Health Services. It has launched Pakistan's first fee-free University in Kasur. Akhuwat College, Kasur is a residential college that caters to students from low-income households who despite their talent and desire to pursue education are unable to do so due to financial constraints. The aim of the college is not only to provide these young people with quality education, but also focuses on cultivating their unique talents, inspiring a deeper sense of ethics, and inculcating the values of discipline, hard work, and volunteerism.

Akhuwat's Education Services includes a network of over 300 schools and 4 colleges. Akhuwat has distributed 2.5 million clothes to low income families across all provinces of Pakistan. This project was appreciated by the Punjab Government and Federal Government. He made a recent visit to Sweden and Denmark to encourage overseas Pakistanis to come forward and do the necessary effort at their end. The Akhuwat Transgender Support Program provides psycho-social therapy, skills and vocational training, literacy and health workshops to thousands of transgenders across Pakistan. They have held free medical camps and awareness seminars, and provided free treatment and vaccinations for diseases such as hepatitis C and hepatitis B.

Akhuwat University 
Currently under-construction, Akhuwat University will be Pakistan's first fee-free university where students will pay their fees according to their means. Through a range of financial instruments, including scholarships and interest-free loans, Akhuwat will ensure equal access to quality education to all eligible students. The University embodies Akhuwat's long-term vision of development and prosperity by preparing a new generation of leaders that will transform their communities and country.

Literary works
The literary works of Muhammad Amjad Saqib include:
 (2021) Chaar Aadmi
 (2020) Integral Finance – Akhuwat A Case Study of the Solidarity Economy
 (2019) Maulo Musali 
 (2016) Kamyab Loag
 (2015) Shahar-e-Lab-e-Darya (This book won the Khushhal Khan Khattak Literary Award)
 (2014) Gotam Ke Dais Main (A travelogue to Nepal) 
 (2014) Akhuwat Ka Safar
 (2014) Dasht-e-Zulmat Main Aik Diya   
 (2014) Aik Yaadgaar Mushaira 
 (2013) Ghurbat Aur Microcredit
 (2009) Devolution and Governance: Reforms in Pakistan edited by Muhammad Amjad Saqib

All Urdu books have been published by Sang-e-Meel Publications 35 Shahrah-e-Pakistan (Lower Mall), Lahore, Pakistan.

Honors and awards
Sitara-i-Imtiaz, awarded by the President of Pakistan for Saqib's work for poverty alleviation in Pakistan (2010)
Gold Medal presented by Prime Minister, Mr. Yousaf Raza Gillani, for Dr. Saqib's contribution to social change in Pakistan (2010)
 Life Time Achievement Award, presented by Abu Dhabi Islamic Bank and Thomson Reuters for Akhuwat's contribution to Islamic Finance (2014)
Social Entrepreneur of the year, awarded by World Economic Forum (WEF) and  Schwab Foundation in recognition of his contributions as a social entrepreneur (2018).
Commonwealth's 31st Point of Light Award presented by Queen Elizabeth II in recognition of Saqib's services for poverty alleviation and restoring human dignity in Pakistan (2018)
Social Entrepreneur Award by Chief Minister Punjab, Mr. Shahbaz Sharif; for Akhuwat's contribution for poverty alleviation (2018)
Islamic Finance Excellence Award by Comsats University Pakistan in commemoration of Akhuwat's contribution to the advancement of Islamic finance (2018)
Shaan-e-Pakistan (Pride of Pakistan) awarded by President of Pakistan, Dr. Arif Alvi acknowledging Dr. Saqib's efforts and welfare work during COVID-19 (2020)
 "I Am The Change" Award (IATC) by Engro Corporation to pay tribute to local change agents who have worked to improve the livelihoods of the poorest of the poor in Pakistan (2013) 
 Honorary Citizenship of Louisville, USA awarded by Mayor Greg E. Fischer for introducing the novel idea of interest-free microfinance. (2014)
 Awarded 35th Human Rights Award presented by Human Rights Society of Pakistan in recognition of his contribution to preserving and ensuring human rights of minorities (HRSP) (2015)
Pace Award, presented by Pakistani American Community for high integrity and innovative ideas under the banner of Akhuwat (2017)
Islamic Economics Application Award at the 6th Islamic Economics Workshop in Turkey for developing underprivileged communities in Pakistan (2018) IGIAD's President Ayhan Karahan (2018)
Islamic Economy Award presented at the Global Islamic Summit by Hamdan bin Mohammed Al Maktoum, Crown Prince of Dubai and Thomson Reuters recognizing Akhuwat's contribution to Islamic Economics (2018).
The Ramon Magsaysay Award 2021 for Saqib's first-of-its-kind interest and collateral-free microfinance loan programme that has helped millions of poor families.

See also

List of philanthropists
Hakim Muhammad Said
Abdul Sattar Edhi
Ruth Pfau

References 

1957 births
Living people
Pakistani humanitarians
Pakistani philanthropists
Pakistani social workers
Punjabi people
King Edward Medical University alumni
University of the Punjab alumni
Recipients of Sitara-i-Imtiaz
Pakistani civil servants
People from Toba Tek Singh District